Benton County is a county in the U.S. state of Iowa. As of the 2020 census, the population was 25,575. 
Its county seat and largest city is Vinton. The county is named for Thomas Hart Benton, a U.S. Senator from Missouri.

Benton County is part of the Cedar Rapids, IA Metropolitan Statistical Area.

History
Benton County was formed on December 21, 1837, from sections of Dubuque County.  It was named after US Senator Thomas Hart Benton.

Geography

Major highways

 Interstate 380
 U.S. Highway 30
 U.S. Highway 151
 U.S. Highway 218
 Iowa Highway 8
 Iowa Highway 21
 Iowa Highway 27
 Iowa Highway 150

Adjacent counties
Black Hawk County  (northwest)
Buchanan County  (northeast)
Linn County  (east)
Iowa County  (south)
Tama County  (west)

Demographics

2020 census
There were 11,076 housing units of which 10,282 were occupied.

2010 census
There were 11,095 housing units, of which 10,302 were occupied.

2000 census
	
As of the census of 2000, there were 25,308 people, 9,746 households, and 7,056 families residing in the county. There were 10,377 housing units at an average density of 14 per square mile (6/km2). The racial makeup of the county was 98.84% White, 0.20% Black or African American, 0.15% Native American, 0.17% Asian, 0.02% Pacific Islander, 0.11% from other races, and 0.52% from two or more races.  0.62% of the population were Hispanic or Latino of any race.

There were 9,746 households, out of which 34.90% had children under the age of 18 living with them, 62.70% were married couples living together, 6.5% had a female householder with no husband present, and 27.6% were non-families. 23.4% of all households were made up of individuals, and 11.70% had someone living alone who was 65 years of age or older.  The average household size was 2.56 and the average family size was 3.04.

In the county, the population was spread out, with 27.4% under the age of 18, 6.8% from 18 to 24, 29.3% from 25 to 44, 21.1% from 45 to 64, and 15.4% who were 65 years of age or older.  The median age was 37 years. For every 100 females, there were 100.0 males.  For every 100 females age 18 and over, there were 95.8 males.

The median income for a household in the county was $42,427, and the median income for a family was $49,701. Males had a median income of $35,044 versus $23,978 for females. The per capita income for the county was $18,891.  About 4.6% of families and 6.1% of the population were below the poverty line, including 7.2% of those under age 18 and 7.0% of those age 65 or over.

Communities

Cities

Atkins
Belle Plaine
Blairstown
Garrison
Keystone
Luzerne
Mount Auburn
Newhall
Norway
Shellsburg
Urbana
Van Horne
Vinton
Walford

Townships
Benton County is divided into twenty townships:

 Benton
 Big Grove
 Bruce
 Canton
 Cedar
 Eden
 Eldorado
 Florence
 Fremont
 Harrison
 Homer
 Iowa
 Jackson
 Kane
 Leroy
 Monroe
 Polk
 St. Clair
 Taylor
 Union

Census-designated place
Watkins

Population ranking
The population ranking of the following table is based on the 2020 census of Benton County.

† county seat

Politics

Education
School districts:
 Belle Plaine Community School District
 Benton Community School District
 Center Point-Urbana Community School District
 College Community School District
 Independence Community School District
 North Linn Community School District
 Vinton-Shellsburg Community School District
 Union Community School District

There was formerly a state-operated school, Iowa Braille and Sight Saving School.

See also
Benton County Courthouse (Iowa)
National Register of Historic Places listings in Benton County, Iowa
Civil Bend

References

 
1837 establishments in Wisconsin Territory
Populated places established in 1837
Cedar Rapids, Iowa metropolitan area